William  Henry Nieder (August 10, 1933 – October 7, 2022) was an American athlete who mainly competed in the shot put.

Nieder was born in Hempstead, New York, and grew up in Lawrence, Kansas. At the time of 1956 Olympics he was married to Sue and had a daughter Connie of about one year of age. At those Games he won a silver medal, losing to Parry O'Brien.  Four years later, he placed fourth at the U.S. Olympic Trials, and was selected to the national team only after Dave Davis withdrew due to an injury. At the Olympics Nieder won a gold medal with a throw of 19.68 m. The mark set a new Olympic record and was an improvement of 5 feet from his mark 4 years earlier.  Parry O'Brien had also improved over that time but was almost 2 feet behind Nieder.

A graduate of the University of Kansas, Nieder was the first collegiate athlete to better the 60-foot mark with a 16-pound shot.  He was also the first high school prep athlete to break the 60-foot barrier with a 12-pound shot put.

Nieder, who set the shot put world record on three occasions, tried boxing when his track and field career ended following the 1960 Olympics.  He was knocked out in his first bout and hung up the gloves for good.

Nieder was employed by 3M and was instrumental in developing artificial athletic turf.  Nieder sold the first ever synthetic track surface for an Olympic Games to the 1968 Mexico City Olympics organizers. Such tracks are now standard at all major track meets.  Nieder later developed a new version of the rubber room.

In 2006 Nieder was inducted into National Track and Field Hall of Fame.

Nieder helped subdue a passenger attempting to enter the cockpit of American Airlines flight 1561 headed to San Francisco on Sunday, May 8, 2011.  He was 77 years old at the time. On October 11, 2022, it was announced by the University of Kansas that Nieder had died in the previous week at the age of 89.

References

External links 

 
 

1933 births
2022 deaths
American male shot putters
Olympic gold medalists for the United States in track and field
Athletes (track and field) at the 1960 Summer Olympics
Athletes (track and field) at the 1956 Summer Olympics
Track and field athletes from Kansas
World record setters in athletics (track and field)
Kansas Jayhawks men's track and field athletes
Medalists at the 1960 Summer Olympics
Medalists at the 1956 Summer Olympics
Olympic silver medalists for the United States in track and field
Sportspeople from Lawrence, Kansas